José Miguel Pérez may refer to:

 José Miguel Pérez (fencer) (born 1938), Puerto Rican fencer
 José Miguel Pérez (triathlete) (born 1986), Spanish triathlete
 José Miguel Pérez (politician) (born 1896), a co-founder of the Communist Party of Cuba